The Scottish budget is an annual Act of the Scottish Parliament, giving statutory authority to the Scottish Government for its revenue and expenditure plans. For the financial year 2022/23 the budget was approximately £49.13 billion.

Until 2020 the Budget Bill was presented to Parliament by the Cabinet Secretary for Finance. The current Finance Secretary is Kate Forbes who replaced Derek Mackay, who served in the role from 2016 to 2020.

Budget Acts 

 Budget (Scotland) Act 2000 (asp 2), presented by Jack McConnell
 Budget (Scotland) Act 2001 (asp 4), presented by Angus Mackay
 Budget (Scotland) Act 2002 (asp 7), presented by Andy Kerr
 Budget (Scotland) Act 2003 (asp 6), presented by Andy Kerr
 Budget (Scotland) Act 2004 (asp 2), presented by Andy Kerr
 Budget (Scotland) Act 2005 (asp 4), presented by Tom McCabe
 Budget (Scotland) Act 2006 (asp 5), presented by Tom McCabe
 Budget (Scotland) Act 2007 (asp 9), presented by Tom McCabe
 Budget (Scotland) Act 2008 (asp 2), presented by John Swinney
 Budget (Scotland) Act 2009 (asp 2), presented by John Swinney
 Budget (Scotland) Act 2010 (asp 4), presented by John Swinney
 Budget (Scotland) Act 2011 (asp 4), presented by John Swinney
 Budget (Scotland) Act 2012 (asp 2), presented by John Swinney
 Budget (Scotland) Act 2013 (asp 4), presented by John Swinney
 Budget (Scotland) Act 2014 (asp 6), presented by John Swinney
 Budget (Scotland) Act 2015 (asp 2), presented by John Swinney
 Budget (Scotland) Act 2016 (asp 12), presented by John Swinney
 Budget (Scotland) Act 2017 (asp 1), presented by Derek Mackay
 Budget (Scotland) Act 2018 (asp 1), presented by Derek Mackay
 Budget (Scotland) Act 2019 (asp 3), presented by Derek Mackay
 Budget (Scotland) Act 2020 (asp 5), presented by Kate Forbes
 Budget (Scotland) Act 2021 (asp 8)
 Budget (Scotland) Act 2022 (asp 3)

See also 
 Economy of Scotland
 European Union budget
 United Kingdom budget
 Countries of the United Kingdom by GVA per capita
 Government spending in the United Kingdom
 United Kingdom national debt

Scottish public finance
Audit Scotland
Barnett formula
Commission on Scottish Devolution
Finance Directorates
Full fiscal autonomy for Scotland
Government Expenditure and Revenue Scotland
Local income tax (Scotland)
Public Accounts Committee of the Scottish Parliament
Public Contracts Scotland
Scotland Act 2012
Scottish Consolidated Fund
Finance and Corporate Services Directorates
Union dividend

References

External links
 Scottish Budget pages at the official Scottish Government website
 

Budget

Budget
Budget